Sadriddin Abdullaev (born 11 June 1986) is a Uzbekistani professional footballer who plays as a midfielder for Pakhtakor Tashkent.

Club career
Abdullaev started his footballing career at Pakhtakor Tashkent. On 25 July 2009, he moved on loan to Changchun Yatai. He played 9 games and scored 2 goals in Season 2009. After the contract with Changchun expired, he returned to Uzbekistan and joined Lokomotiv Tashkent in 2010.
At the end of November 2014 he signed a contract with T-Team, club playing in Malaysian Premier League. On 2016, he returned to Lokomotiv Tashkent.

International career
Abdullaev made his debut for Uzbekistan in a 2010 FIFA World Cup qualification match against Saudi Arabia in a 0–4 defeat on 22 June 2008.

Honours

Club
Pakhtakor
 Uzbek League: 2005, 2006, 2007
 Uzbek League runner-up: 2008
 Uzbek Cup: 2005, 2006, 2007
 CIS Cup: 2007

Lokomotiv
 Uzbek League runner-up: 2013, 2014
 Uzbek Cup: 2014

References

External links
 

1986 births
Living people
Sportspeople from Tashkent
Uzbekistani footballers
Pakhtakor Tashkent FK players
Uzbekistani expatriate sportspeople in China
Chinese Super League players
Changchun Yatai F.C. players
Expatriate footballers in China
PFC Lokomotiv Tashkent players
Association football midfielders
Uzbekistan Super League players
Uzbekistan international footballers